Károly Güttler (born 15 June 1968 in Budapest) is a former breaststroker from Hungary, who represented his native country at four consecutive Olympics, beginning with the 1988 Summer Olympics in Seoul and ending with the 2000 Summer Olympics in Sydney, Australia. He won the silver medal in the 100 m and 200 m breaststroke, once each, both at separate Games.

Güttler enjoyed a productive year in 1993 when he won gold and silver in the 100 m and 200 m breaststroke respectively at the European Championships in Sheffield, United Kingdom. He broke the 100 m breaststroke world record in the semifinal, with 1:00.95. This record stood until 1996. This led to him being awarded the World Swimmer of the Year and European Swimmer of the Year by Swimming World Magazine.

Awards
 Hungarian swimmer of the Year (2): 1993, 1999
 Swimming World Magazine – World Swimmer of the Year (1): 1993
 Immortal of Hungarian swimming (2015)

External links
Profile on FINA-website

1968 births
Living people
Olympic swimmers of Hungary
Swimmers at the 1988 Summer Olympics
Swimmers at the 1992 Summer Olympics
Swimmers at the 1996 Summer Olympics
Swimmers at the 2000 Summer Olympics
Swimmers from Budapest
Olympic silver medalists for Hungary
World record setters in swimming
World Aquatics Championships medalists in swimming
European Aquatics Championships medalists in swimming
European champions for Hungary
Medalists at the 1996 Summer Olympics
Medalists at the 1988 Summer Olympics
Olympic silver medalists in swimming